Jacob "Jaap" Meijer (20 April 1905 in Amsterdam – 2 December 1943 in Meer, Belgium) was a track cyclist from the Netherlands, who represented his native country at the 1924 Summer Olympics in Paris, France. There he won the silver medal in the Men's 1.000m Sprint (Scratch).

See also
 List of Dutch Olympic cyclists

References

External links
 Dutch Olympic Committee 
 

1905 births
1943 deaths
Dutch male cyclists
Cyclists at the 1924 Summer Olympics
Olympic cyclists of the Netherlands
Olympic silver medalists for the Netherlands
Cyclists from Amsterdam
Dutch track cyclists
Olympic medalists in cycling
Medalists at the 1924 Summer Olympics
20th-century Dutch people